HMS Beagle was a wooden-hulled  second-class screw gunvessel launched in 1854 and sold in 1863. She was the third vessel of the Royal Navy to use the name.

Design
The Crimean War sparked a sudden need for shallow-draught, manoeuvrable vessels for inshore work in the Baltic and the Black Sea. The Arrow class of six wooden-hulled screw steamers were built during 1854 to a design by the Surveyor's Department.  Construction was undertaken at two commercial yards on the Thames, R & H Green and C J Mare & Company, both of Leamouth, London.  Two further designs of Crimean War gunvessel were ordered during 1855, the Intrepid class and the Vigilant class.  The class was built as despatch vessels, but in 1856 were re-designated as second-class gunvessels.

Propulsion
A two-cylinder horizontal single expansion steam engine supplied by Humphrys, Tennant and Dykes provided  through a single screw.

Sail plan
All Arrow-class gunvessels were barque-rigged.

Armament
The Arrow class were provided with two 68-pounder Lancaster muzzle-loading rifled guns weighing  on pivot mounts, and four 32-pounder  guns.

Construction
Beagle was laid down at the Leamouth yard of C J Mare & Company on 15 April 1854 and launched on 20 July the same year.  She was commissioned into the Royal Navy two months later on 3 September.

Career
Beagle took part in the Crimean War from 1854 to 1856.  During the Crimean War, two of her ship's company were awarded the Victoria Cross for their actions: Joseph Trewavas was awarded the VC for his actions in the Sea of Azov, and an acting-mate in Beagle, William Hewett, was awarded the VC for his actions in defending a shore battery.

Disposal
Beagle was sold to the Satsuma Domain (薩摩藩) of Japan at Hong Kong in 1863 to be used as a training vessel, and was renamed Kenko (乾行) in 1865. She was broken up in 1889.

References

Bibliography

 

Arrow-class gunvessels
Ships built in Leamouth
1854 ships
Victorian-era gunboats of the United Kingdom
Crimean War naval ships of the United Kingdom
Naval ships of Japan